Loris Vignolini (born 8 December 1947) is an Italian racing cyclist. He rode in the 1970 Tour de France.

References

External links
 

1947 births
Living people
Italian male cyclists
Place of birth missing (living people)
People from Quarrata
Sportspeople from the Province of Pistoia
Cyclists from Tuscany